Kaushik Ghatak began his career in the entertainment industry in India on 14 February 1998 as an apprentice assistant to the prominent filmmaker, Anurag Basu. He has directed several television serials and a few advertisement films before he directed his first film Ek Vivaah... Aisa Bhi for Rajshri Productions. He next film was Samrat & Co. for producer, Kavita K. Barjatya, under the banner of Rajshri Productions.

Early life and education
Kaushik Ghatak was born in Katwa in Bardhaman, West Bengal on 12 August 1971. He attended St. Xavier's school at Hazaribagh in Bihar & graduated from St. Xavier's college, Ranchi with Geology (Hons). He enrolled at the Asian Academy of Film & Television, Noida to learn the skills of film making. Prominent film maker, Anurag Basu provided Ghatak with the first break as an apprentice assistant; Ghatak assisted Basu on several television projects – Rishtey, Raahat, Saturday Suspense, Koshish-‐Ek Aasha and more. Ghatak also assisted Partho Mitra, Gaurav Pandey, Goutam Mukherjee and Amitabh Bhattacharyaon on different shows, ad-films and television commercials.

Career

Television
Ghatak's first independent show as a director was with a Bengali serial Amra Povashi aired on Alpha Bangla and with a Hindi serial Kyunki Saas Bhi Kabhi Bahu Thi produced by Balaji Telefilms and aired on Star Plus. Starting from the 35th episode up to the 155th episode, Ghatak directed over 100 episodes of Kyunki Saas Bhi Kabhi Bahu Thi and at this time the show registered the highest TRP at the time of original Mihir Virani's death; post Ghatak's exit from the project, the show went steadily downhill.

Films
Ghatak made his directorial film debut in 2008 with the film Ek Vivaah... Aisa Bhi starring Sonu Sood and Isha Koppikar. It was produced by Sooraj R. Barjatya, under the Rajshri Productions banner. This film did not perform too well at the box office. His next project was with producer Kavita K. Barjatya, under the Rajshri Productions banner; the film was Samrat & Co. (2014).

Personal life
Kaushik Ghatak was in love with Anita Ghatak and they had to wait for seven years before they could get married. They have two sons, Shashwat Ghatak and Shansit Ghatak.

References

1971 births
Living people
Indian television directors
Film directors from West Bengal